Southpark Mall or South Park Mall may refer to:

SouthPark Mall (Moline, Illinois)
SouthPark Mall (Charlotte, North Carolina)
South Park Mall, a defunct mall in Shreveport, Louisiana
SouthPark Mall (Strongsville, Ohio)
South Park Mall (San Antonio), Texas
Southpark Mall (Colonial Heights, Virginia)

See also
 South Park (disambiguation)